Acer ginnala, the Amur maple, is a  plant species with woody stems native to northeastern Asia from easternmost Mongolia east to Korea and Japan, and north to the Russian Far East in the Amur River valley. It is a small maple with deciduous leaves that is sometimes grown as a garden subject or boulevard tree.

Description 
The bark is thin, dull gray-brown, and smooth at first but becoming shallowly fissured on old plants. The flowers are yellow-green,  diameter, produced in spreading panicles in spring as the leaves open.

Taxonomy 
Amur maple is closely related to Acer tataricum (Tatar maple), and some botanists treat it as a subspecies  A. tataricum subsp. ginnala (Maxim.) Wesm. The glossy, deeply lobed leaves of A. ginnala distinguish it from A. tataricum, which has matte, unlobed or only shallowly lobed leaves.

Cultivation and uses 
Acer ginnala is grown as an ornamental plant in northern regions of Europe and North America. It is the most cold-tolerant maple, hardy to zone 2. It is naturalised in parts of North America. Planted on exceptional sites facing south west with consistent moisture and light loamy soils, this tree can grow 3 to 4 feet per year making it a fast grower.  It is often planted as a shrub along borders.

In the UK it has gained the Royal Horticultural Society's Award of Garden Merit.

It is also valued in Japan and elsewhere as a species suitable for bonsai.

It is a nonnative invasive species in parts of northern America.

Cultivars 
Due to its vigor and fall colors of yellows and bright reds, the size being a small tree of 6 metres (20 feet) wide by 6 m tall on average, it suits many for smaller landscapes and for planting under power lines.  Cultivars have emerged for those wanting these attributes.

 Flame (Fiery red autumn foliage, very strong vigor)

References

External links 
 
 
 Winter ID pictures

ginnala
Flora of Mongolia
Flora of China
Flora of the Russian Far East
Flora of Eastern Asia
Plants used in bonsai
Garden plants of Asia
Trees of Korea